Lennard Oehl (born 1 June 1993) is a German economist and politician of the Social Democratic Party (SPD) and has been serving as a member of the Bundestag since 2021.

Political career
Oehl became member of the Bundestag in the 2021 elections, representing the Hanau district. In parliament, he has since been serving on the Finance Committee.

Other activities
 Business Forum of the Social Democratic Party of Germany, Member of the Political Advisory Board (since 2022)

References 

Living people
1993 births
Social Democratic Party of Germany politicians
Members of the Bundestag 2021–2025
21st-century German politicians
Politicians from Frankfurt